Dragan Đurđević (born 18 April 1981) is a Serbian football manager who is last known to have managed Jonava.

Playing career

Before the 2007 season, Đurđević signed for Kazakhstani side Ordabasy after playing for Olimpik (Sarajevo) in Bosnia and Herzegovina, where he made 48 appearances and scored 9 goals.

Before the second half of 2008/09, he signed for Serbian club Jagodina.

Before the 2011 season, Đurđević signed for Andijon in Uzbekistan after playing for Kazakhstani team Kairat.

Managerial career

After retirement, he was appointed assistant manager of Taraz in the Kazakhstan.

In 2016, he was appointed manager of Serbian outfit Jagodina.

Before the 2020 season, Đurđević was appointed manager of Samut Sakhon in the Thai second division after working as director of Kazakhstani side Atyrau.

In 2021, he was appointed manager of Jonava in the Lithuanian second division.

References

External links
 Dragan Đurđević at playmakerstats.com
 

Expatriate football managers in Kazakhstan
Expatriate football managers in Lithuania
Serbian expatriate footballers
1981 births
Association football midfielders
Association football defenders
Association football forwards
Living people
Kazakhstan Premier League players
Serbian expatriate sportspeople in Bosnia and Herzegovina
Serbian expatriate sportspeople in Uzbekistan
Serbian expatriate sportspeople in Lithuania
Serbian expatriate sportspeople in Thailand
Serbian expatriate sportspeople in Kazakhstan
Expatriate footballers in Uzbekistan
Expatriate footballers in Bosnia and Herzegovina
Expatriate footballers in Kazakhstan
Serbian footballers
Expatriate football managers in Thailand
FC Ordabasy players
FK Jagodina players
FC Kairat players
FK Andijon players
Serbian football managers